The 2011 CBA Playoffs is the postseason for the Chinese Basketball Association's 2010–11 season. The playoffs started on March 23, 2011 with CCTV-5, and many local channels broadcasting the games in China. Eight teams qualified for the playoffs, all seeded 1 to 8 in a tournament bracket, with first and second round in a best-of-five format, and a final in a best-of-seven format.

Playoff qualifying

 Note +: March 11 was the last matchday of regular season.

Bracket
Teams in bold advanced to the next round. The numbers to the left of each team indicate the team's seeding in regular season, and the numbers to the right indicate the number of games the team won in that round. Home court advantage belongs to the team with the better regular season record; teams enjoying the home advantage are shown in italics.

Match details
All times are in China standard time (UTC+8)

Quarterfinals

(1) Xinjiang Flying Tigers vs. (8) Beijing Ducks

(2) Guangdong Southern Tigers vs. (7) Bayi Rockets

(3) Dongguan Leopards vs. (6) Zhejiang Lions

(4) Jiangsu Dragons vs. (5) Zhejiang Cyclone

Semifinals

(1) Xinjiang Flying Tigers vs. (4) Jiangsu Dragons

(2) Guangdong Southern Tigers vs. (3) Dongguan Leopards

CBA Finals: (1) Xinjiang Flying Tigers vs. (2) Guangdong Southern Tigers

Notes and references

External links
Official Website 
163 CBA Coverage

Chinese Basketball Association playoffs
playoffs